Hélène Wezeu Dombeu (born 8 October 1987) is a Cameroonian judoka. She is a two-time gold medalist in the women's 63 kg at the African Games, both in 2015 and in 2019, and a silver medalist at the Commonwealth Games.

Career 

She won the gold medal in the women's 63 kg event at the 2019 African Games held in Rabat, Morocco.

She competed at the 2014 Commonwealth Games where she won a silver medal in the 63 kg event.

In 2020, she won one of the bronze medals in the women's 63 kg event at the African Judo Championships held in Antananarivo, Madagascar.

Achievements

References

External links 
 

Living people
1987 births
Place of birth missing (living people)
Cameroonian female judoka
Competitors at the 2015 African Games
Competitors at the 2019 African Games
African Games medalists in judo
African Games gold medalists for Cameroon
Judoka at the 2014 Commonwealth Games
Commonwealth Games silver medallists for Cameroon
Commonwealth Games medallists in judo
21st-century Cameroonian women
Medallists at the 2014 Commonwealth Games